Aalemane is a 1981 Kannada movie, starring Suresh Heblikar, Mohan Kumar, Roopa Chakravarthi and Upasane Seetaram. The film was directed by Mohan Kumar and features musical score by the Ashwath-Vaidi duo. The film was a musical hit and won the Karnataka State Film Award for Best Lyricist for Doddarange Gowda.

Plot
Bhaira is a villager well known for his psychotic nature and his beautiful wife Honni. At dusk one evening, Honni is brutally raped and murdered. The villagers blame Bhaira for Honni's murder and are on the move to punish him. Bhaira confronts them with the truth, but his truth is unheard. Bhaira then seeks help of the new village teacher and asks him to trace the truth for him. Will the teacher be able to end this blame game and find the truth behind the murder?

Cast
 Suresh Heblikar
 Mohan Kumar
 Roopa Chakravarthy
 Surekha
 Upasane Seetharam
 B. G. Kumbar
 Tomato Somu
 Sundara Murthy
 Shashi Kiran

Soundtrack
Doddarangegowda won the Karnataka State Film Award (Special Jury Award) for his lyrics in this film.

"Namoora Mandaara Hoove" was used as the title track for the  movie Nammoora Mandara Hoove.

References

1981 films
1980s Kannada-language films
Films scored by C. Ashwath
Films scored by L. Vaidyanathan